This is a list of solo piano pieces by Francis Poulenc.

List 
Trois pastorales (1917), FP 5
Très vite
Très lent
Vite
Trois pièces (1918, 1928), FP 48
Pastorale
Hymne
Toccata
 Mouvements perpétuels (1919), FP 14
No. 1 Assez modéré
No. 2 Très modéré
No. 3 Alerte
 Valse (from L'Album des Six) (1919), FP 17
Suite en ut (1920), FP 19
I Presto
II Andante
III Vif
Cinq Impromptus (1920-1921, revised 1939), FP 21
No. 1 Très agité
No. 2 Allegro vivace
No. 3 Très modéré
No. 4 Violent
No. 5 Andante
Promenades (1921), FP 24
No. 1. A pied
No. 2. En auto
No. 3. A cheval
No. 4. En bateau
No. 5. En avion
No. 6. En autobus
No. 7. En voiture
No. 8. En chemin de fer
No. 9. A bicyclette
No. 10. En diligence
Napoli (1925), FP 40
No. 1 Barcarolle (Assez animé)
No. 2 Nocturne (Lent)
No. 3 Caprice Italien (Presto)
 Pastourelle (extrait de L'éventail de Jeanne) (1927), FP 45
 Trois novelettes (1927-1928, 1958), FP 47 (first two) and FP 173 (third)
No. 1 en ut majeur /in C Major, FP 47
No. 2 en si bémol mineur /in B-flat minor, FP 47
No. 3 en mi mineur /in E minor, FP 173
 Huit Nocturnes (1929-1938), FP 56
No. 1 en ut majeur /in C Major
No. 2 en la majeur /in A Major ("Bal de jeunes filles")
No. 3 en fa majeur /in F Major ("Les Cloches de Malines")
No. 4 en ut mineur /in C minor
No. 5 en ré mineur /in D minor ("Phalenes")
No. 6 en sol majeur /in G Major
No. 7 en mi bémol /in E-flat Major
No. 8 en sol majeur /in G Major
Pièce brève sur le nom d'Albert Roussel (1929), FP 50
Soirées de Nazelles, Suite pour piano (1930-1936), FP 84
Préambule
Variations
Le comble de la distinction
Le cœur sur la main
La désinvolture et la discrétion
La suite dans les idées
Le charme enjôleur
Le contentement de soi
Le goût du malheur
L'alerte vieillesse
Cadence
Final
Valse-improvisation sur le nom de Bach (1932), FP 62
Quinze improvisations pour piano (1932-1959), FP 63 (Nos. 1-10), FP 113 (Nos. 11-12), FP 170 (Nos. 13-14) and FP 176 (No. 15)
 No. 1 en si mineur/in B minor, FP 63
 No. 2 en la bémol/in A-flat Major, FP 63
 No. 3 en si mineur/in B minor, FP 63
 No. 4 en la bémol/in A-flat Major, FP 63
 No. 5 en la mineur/in A minor, FP 63
 No. 6 en si bémol/in B-flat Major, FP 63
 No. 7 en ut majeur/in C Major, FP 63
 No. 8 en la mineur/in A minor, FP 63
 No. 9 en ré majeur/in D Major, FP 63
No. 10 en fa majeur/in F Major, FP 63
No. 11 en sol mineur/in G minor, FP 113
No. 12 en mi bémol/in E-flat Major, FP 113
No. 13 en la mineur/in A minor, FP 170
No. 14 en ré bémol/in D-flat Major, FP 170
No. 15 en ut mineur/in C minor, FP 176
 Villageoises, pièces enfantines pour piano (1933), FP 65
No. 1 Valse tyrolienne
No. 2 Staccato
No. 3 Rustique
No. 4 Polka
No. 5 Petite ronde
No. 6 Coda
Trois Feuillets d'album (1933), FP 68
No. 1 Ariette
No. 2 Rêve
No. 3 Gigue
 Presto en si bémol majeur (B-flat major) - (1934), FP 70
 Humoresque (1934), FP 72
 Badinage (1934), FP 73
 Trois intermezzi (1934, 1943), FP 71 (Nos. 1 & 2) and FP 118 (No. 3)
 No. 1 en ut majeur/in C Major, FP 71
 No. 2 en ré bémol majeur/in D-flat Major, FP 71
 No. 3 en la bémol majeur/in A-flat Major, FP 118
 Suite française, d'après Claude Gervaise (1935), FP 80
 Bransle de Bourgogne
 Pavane
 Petite marche militaire
 Complainte
 Bransle de Champagne
 Sicilienne
 Carillon
 Bourrée, au pavillon d'Auvergne (1937), FP 87
 Française, d'après Claude Gervaise (1939), FP 103
 Mélancolie (1940), FP 105
 L'embarquement pour Cythère, valse-musette pour Deux Pianos (1951), FP 150
Thème varié (1951), FP 151
Theme
Variation I - Jojeuse
Variation II - Noble
Variation III - Pastorale
Variation IV - Sarcastique
Variation V - Melancolique
Variation VI - Ironique
Variation VII - Elegiaque
Variation VIII - Volubile
Variation IX - Fantasque
Variation X - Sibylline
Variation XI - Finale

See also 
 Francis Poulenc
 List of compositions by Francis Poulenc
Les Six

References
Sources
Wright, Simon: Poulenc Piano Music and Chamber Works in Pascal Rogé: Francis Poulenc 1899-1963 Piano Works Chamber Music Decca CD Set 475 7097
Roy, Jean: Francis Poulenc Oeuvres complètes (1963-2013) L'Édition du 50e Anniversaire - EMI/Warner France Classics' 20 CD release marking the 50th anniversary of Poulenc's death.  The in-depth accompanying material entitled, Francis Poulenc 1899-1963, L'intégrale de ses oeuvres, Edition du 50e anniversaire 1963-2013 was translated into English by Hugh Graham.

External links
IMSLP page, accessed 14 September 2011

Piano compositions by French composers
Lists of compositions by composer
Lists of piano compositions by composer
Piano compositions in the 20th century